Menetia alanae, also known commonly as Alana's menetia and the  Top End dwarf skink, is a species of lizard in the family Scincidae. The species is endemic to Australia.

Etymology
The specific name, alanae (genitive, feminine) is in honor of Australian herpetologist Alana Young.

Geographic range
M. alanae is found in Northern Territory in Australia.

Habitat
The preferred natural habitats of M. alanae are forest and savanna.

Description
M. alanae is a small, long-tailed skink. The tail is 1.3 times SVL.

Reproduction
M. alanae is oviparous.

References

Further reading
Cogger HG (2014). Reptiles and Amphibians of Australia, Seventh Edition. Clayton, Victoria, Australia: CSIRO Publishing. xxx + 1,033 pp. .
Rankin PR (1979). "A taxonomic revision of the genus Menetia (Lacertilia, Scincidae) in the Northern Territory". Records of the Australian Museum 32 (14): 491–499. (Menetia alanae, new species, pp. 492–493 + Figures 1–3).
Wilson S, Swan G (2013). A Complete Guide to Reptiles of Australia, Fourth Edition. Sydney: New Holland Publishers. 522 pp. .

Menetia
Reptiles described in 1979
Skinks of Australia
Endemic fauna of Australia